Isegrim or Isegrimm (also Isengrin, Ysengrin, Ysengrimus) may refer to:

Isengrim, the wolf character in Reynard the Fox
Ysengrin, a wolf-like character in webcomic Gunnerkrigg Court
Ysengrimus a 12th-century series of fables about Ysengrimus the Wolf and Reinardus the Fox
Der Isegrimm, a poem by Joseph Freiherr von Eichendorff
Isegrimm, a patriotic novel by Willibald Alexis, published 1864
Izegrim (band), formerly Isegrim, a female-fronted death/thrash metal band from the Netherlands
Michael Isengrin, 16th-century printer in Basel, see Horapollo
Wolfpack Isegrim, a German wolfpack of World War II

See also
Isegrim & Reineke, 2004 TV movie by Éric Berthier